Road and Street Traffic Awareness (RASTA 88.6 FM) is a radio station in Lahore, Pakistan that broadcasts traffic information 24 hours a day on 88.6 MHz on the FM broadcast band.  It is the first 24-hour traffic program in Pakistan.  The station was funded and constructed by United Team Network Technologies (UTNT), a Pakistan-based system design and integration firm.  It is manned by members of the Lahore Traffic Police.  RASTA facilities include 
 Integrated control room
 24/7 traffic helpline 
 Website showing live traffic conditions in map and in tabular form
 Commercial free FM 88.6 traffic radio
 Traffic cameras connected with control room
 Variable messaging systems (VMS)
 Traffic messaging
 Automated phone service for traffic update
 Educational resources regarding Pakistan driving laws

A second phase is planned that will include cable and satellite television channels.

References

Radio stations in Pakistan
Transport in Lahore
Mass media in Lahore